Hillfield Park, Solihull, West Midlands is a community open space and play park in Monkspath, Solihull. It is built on a landfill site, its contours being produced by the earth settling as gases escape.

History
The park was opened in 1984 to help meet the recreation needs of people in the local area. 

In late 2009 a new children's playground was built. Refurbished as part of year 2 Playbuilder project, the project created Embankment slides, Activity trail, Wobble board, V Bridge, Junior swings, Toddler swings, Suspension bridge, Roller balance beam, Stepping logs, Junior multi play, Chain walk, Zip Slide. Climbing boulders and natural play features including willow arch and sensory planting.

Wildlife
The park is home to a wide variety of bird life including swallows, swifts, herons, peregrine falcons and buzzards.

Facilities
3 car parks,
Lake, River and/or Stream, 
Recreational area, 
Play Area, and
Football Pitches

References

External links
Photos
Solihull Parks Website

Solihull
Parks and open spaces in the West Midlands (county)